Katherine Ross and variants may refer to:
 Catherine Ross (Museumand), founder of UK museum of Caribbean heritage
 Catherine L. Ross, American educator
 Catherine Sheldrick Ross (1945–2021), Canadian professor and dean
 Kate Ross (1956–1998), American author
 Katharine Ross (born 1940), American actress
 Katherine Ross (scientist), British marine biologist
 Katherine Ross (died 1697), Scottish Covenanter, memoirist and schoolmistress
 Kathryn Ross (rower) (born 1981), Australian Paralympic rower
 Kathryn Ross (writer) (born 1966),  British writer